Paraliostola durantoni is a species of beetle in the family Cerambycidae. It was described by Tavakilian and Monné in 1991.

References

Hesperophanini
Beetles described in 1991